The Seventeen Tantras of the Esoteric Instruction Series or the Seventeen tantras of the Ancients (rnying-ma'i rgyud bcu-bdun) are an important collection of tantras in the Nyingma school of Tibetan Buddhism. They comprise the core scriptures of the "esoteric instruction series" (Menngagde) of Dzogchen teachings and are its most authoritative scriptures. 

The Seventeen Tantras are part of the Vima Nyingthig ("Inner Essence of Vimalamitra"), a terma cycle of Dzogchen texts revealed by the treasure discoverer Zhangton Tashi Dorje (c. 1097-1127) and associated with the 8th century Indian monk Vimalamitra who is traditionally believed by the Nyingma school to have first brought these texts to Tibet. 

The Vima Nyingthig itself consists of 'tantras' (rgyud), 'agamas' (lung), and 'upadeshas' (man ngag). The other texts are mainly exegetical literature on the material found in the Seventeen tantras. The Seventeen Tantras explain the view (lta ba) of Dzogchen, the two main forms of Dzogchen meditation (sgom pa) - kadag trekchö ("the cutting through of primordial purity"), and lhündrub tögal ("the direct crossing of spontaneous presence") - and the conduct (spyod pa) of a Dzogchen practitioner, along with other ancillary topics.

History 

Contemporary Tibetologists like David Germano and Christopher Hatchell hold that the Vima Nyingthig was likely composed by its discoverer, the terton Zhangton Tashi Dorje (1097-1127). Germano also holds that the first "historically attested" figure connected with these tantras is Chetsün Sengé Wangchuk (lce btsun seng ge dbang phyug, c. 11th century). 

Samten Karmay writes that while Vimalamitra is attested in the sources as a Buddhist monk, there is "a fair amount of uncertainty" about this figure (and likewise about his supposed student, Nyangban Tingzin Zangpo). Vimalamitra's name does appear in some Tibetan inscriptions however. Karmay also notes that certain critics of Dzogchen claimed that it was Chetsün Sengé Wangchuk who authored the Seventeen Tantras.

According to Bryan J. Cuevas, while the traditional Nyingma view is that the Seventeen Tantras were divine revelations received by Garab Dorje, these texts seem to have been "compiled over a long period of time by multiple hands." Cuevas also writes that "the precise identity of these unknown redactors is a riddle that I hope may soon be solved. Whatever the case, we must accept that the collection in the form it is known to us today consists of several layers of history reflecting diverse influences."

Germano also notes that from the time of Chetsün Sengé Wangchuk onwards, "we have datable [historical] figures" in what constitutes a lineage of the Seventeen Tantras. This lineage is as follows: Chetsün Sengé Wangchuk's disciple Zhangton Tashi Dorje (1097-1167), Zhangton's son Nyima Bum (1158-1213), Nyima Bum's nephew Guru jo 'ber (1172-1231), Jo 'ber's disciple Trulzhik Sengge Gyabpa ('khrul zhig seng ge rgyab pa, 1200s), Trulzhik's disciple Melong Dorje (1243-1303), and Melong's disciple Kumaradza (1266-1343), who was the root guru of Longchenpa (1308-1363).

Traditional Nyingma history
In the Nyingma school, the Seventeen Tantras are traditionally said to be translations of Indian texts by figures of the Early Dissemination period, mainly the 8th-century Indian monk Vimalamitra, through his teacher Shri Singha. They are traced back to the quasi-historical figure of Garab Dorje (who is said to have received them from the Buddha Samantabhadra). According to Germano the traditional account of the history of the Seventeen tantras can be found in the sNying thig lo rgyus chen po (The Great Chronicles of the Seminal Heart), a history found in the Vima Nyingtik, which was "possibly authored" by Zhangton Tashi Dorje.

Erik Pema Kunsang outlines the basic traditional lineage as follows:The first human vidyadhara in the Dzogchen lineage was Garab Dorje, who compiled the 6,400,000 tantras of the Great Perfection. He entrusted these teachings to his main disciple, Manjushrimitra, who then classified them into the Three Sections of Dzogchen: Mind Section, Space Section, and Instruction Section. The chief disciple of Manjushrimitra, the great master known as Shri Singha, divided the Instruction Section into The Four Cycles of Nyingthig: the Outer, Inner, Secret, and Innermost Unexcelled Cycles.According to Kunsang, traditional Nyingma accounts hold that Shri Singha brought these teachings from Bodhgaya to place Kunsang identifies as China. Shri Singha is also believed to have transmitted the Eighteen Dzogchen Tantras (see below) to Padmasambhava. Shri Singha is said to have hid these texts before his death. The Dharma Fellowship (2009), drawing on the work of Lalou (1890–1967), holds the 'Five Peaked Mountain' which Kunsang and others have attributed to Mount Wutai in China is instead a mountain near the Kinnaur District associated with the historical nation of 'Zhang-zhung' (also known as Suvarṇadvīpa).

The Indian scholar Vimalamitra (fl. 8th century), a student of Sri Singha, is closely associated with the Seventeen Tantras in the Nyingma histories, and it is traditionally held that his student Nyangban Tingzin Zangpo transmitted and concealed these scriptures at Zha Lhakhang (zhwa'i lha khang, "Temple of the Hat") after Vimalamitra left Tibet. The Seventeen Tantras are then said to have been discovered by Dangma Lhungyel (11th century), a caretaker monk of Zha Lhakhang, who then proceeded to transmit these teachings to Chetsün Sengé Wangchuk.

Texts

According to Hatchell, the Seventeen Tantras "are stylistically quite similar" and all depict themselves as being taught by Buddhas in a question and answer dialogue with their retinue in various settings, such as space, volcanoes and charnel grounds. The dialogues discuss all the main Nyingthig Dzogchen topics, including the basis, cosmogony, the subtle body, buddha-nature, meditative techniques, mandalas, post-death states or bardos, as well as funerary and subjugation rituals.

Kunsang provides the following list of the seventeen tantras:
 'The Reverberation of Sound Tantra''' (Skt: ratnākara śabda mahā prasaṅga tantra). This is the root tantra of the Seventeen tantras and focuses on practices related to sound.
'The Tantra of Graceful Auspiciousness (Skt: mahā svaccha suvarṇāpramāṇa śrī tantra). 
'The Mind Mirror of Samantabhadra Tantra (Skt: samantabhadra cittādarśa tantra).
'The Blazing Lamp Tantra (Skt: svarṇṇa puṣpa kānti ratnāloka jvala tantra).Hatchell, Christopher (2009). 
 Naked Seeing: The Great Perfection, the Wheel of Time, and visionary philosophy in renaissance Tibet. University of Virginia, p. 373
'The Mind Mirror of Vajrasattva Tantra (Skt: vajrasatva cittādarśa tantra).
'The Self-Arising Rigpa Tantra (Skt: sarva tathāgata samādhi paribhāṣā jñāna samudāya sūtra mahāyāna guhyānuttara tantra sarva dharmākara sarva buddhānyaśayam mantraikajnāna mahāsandhyarthaprakatatantra vidyāsvodayamahātantranāma).
'The Tantra of Studded Jewels' (Skt: sarva bhrānti pr̥ kara ratna dhūrta mata tantra nāma)
'Direct Introduction Tantra (Skt: darśanopadeśa ratnācita kṣetra dhātu śāsana tantra).
'The Six Spaces of Samantabhadra Tantra (Skt: samantabhadrāvartta ṣaṣṭha tantra).
'The Tantra Without Syllables''' (Skt: anakṣara mahā tantra nāma ratna dhvaja rāja saṃtati dr̥ṣṭi gagana sama mahā tantra).'The Lion's Perfect Expressive Power Tantra (Skt: mahā siṃha parākrama pūrṇṇa tantra).'The Necklace of Precious Pearls Tantra (Skt: ratna muṣṭi mūlā tantra).'The Self-liberated Rigpa Tantra (Skt: mahā vidyā svamukti sarva ghaṭṭita tantra).'The Mound of Jewels Tantra (Skt: ratna kūṭa mahā guṇoddeśa tantra rāja).'The Shining Relics Tantra (Skt: śrī gagana śarīra jvala mahā tantra).
 'The Union of the Sun and Moon Tantra (Skt: mahā sūrya candra ghana guhya tantra).'The Self-existing Perfection Tantra (Skt: kāyālokoddiṣṭābhisiñca mahā svayambhū tantra).

Other tantras 
The Seventeen Tantras are often grouped together with other tantras as a set.

They are designated as "The Eighteen Tantras" when the Troma Tantra (Ngagsung Tromay Tantra') otherwise known as The Tantra of the Black Wrathful Shri Ekajati (dpal e ka dza ti nag mo khros ma'i rgyud) which deals with the protective rites of Ekajati, is appended to the seventeen. 

The "Nineteen Tantras" are the eighteen above along with the Tantra of the Lucid Expanse ('Longsel Barwey Tantra'). Samantabhadrī is associated with the Longsel Barwey and its full name is 'Tantra of Brahmā's Sun of the Luminous Expanse of Samantabhadrī.

According to Germano, another tantra which is closely associated with the Seventeen Tantras is the Thig le kun gsal (Total Illumination of the Bindu).

Sources, versions and variations
These Seventeen Tantras are to be found in the Canon of the Ancient School, the 'Nyingma Gyubum', volumes 9 and 10, folio numbers 143-159 of the edition edited by 'Jamyang Khyentse Rinpoche' commonly known as Dilgo Khyentse Rinpoche (Thimpu, Bhutan, 1973), reproduced from the manuscript preserved at 'Tingkye Gonpa Jang'  Monastery in Tibet.

 Commentaries 
The most influential commentator on the topics of the Seventeen Tantras is Longchen Rabjampa (1308–1364). Karmay 211 His numerous writings, including the Seven Treasuries and Lama Yangtig, comment on the major topics of the Seventeen Tantras and the Vima Nyingthig. According to Germano, Longchenpa integrated the doctrines and practices of the Seventeen Tantras "into the increasingly normative modernist discourses that had taken shape from the contemporary Indian Buddhist logico-epistemological circles, Madhyamaka, Yogacara, and tantric traditions of the late tenth to thirteenth centuries."

English translationsThe Self-Arising Rigpa Tantra is translated by Malcolm Smith in The Self-Arisen Vidya Tantra (vol 1) and The Self-Liberated Vidya Tantra (vol 2): A Translation of the Rigpa Rang Shar (vol 1) and A Translation of the Rigpa Rangdrol (vol 2) (Wisdom Publications, 2018). Chapters 39 and 40 translated by H. V. Guenther in Wholeness Lost and Wholeness Regained (SUNY Press, 1994).
The Self-Liberated Rigpa Tantra is translated by Smith in The Self-Arisen Vidya Tantra (vol 1) and The Self-Liberated Vidya Tantra (vol 2).
Excerpts from the fourth chapter of The Lion's Perfect Expressive Power are translated by Janet Gyatso in Buddhist Scriptures (Ed. Donald Lopez, published by Penguin Classics, 2004)The Blazing Lamp Tantra and The Tantra Without Syllables is translated by Smith in The Tantra Without Syllables (Vol 3) and The Blazing Lamp Tantra (Vol 4): A Translation of the Yigé Mepai Gyu (Vol. 3) A Translation of the Drönma Barwai Gyu and Mutik Trengwa Gyupa (Vol 4) (Wisdom Publications, 2020).
The Blazing Lamp is translated by Christopher Hatchell in Naked Seeing: The Great Perfection, the Wheel of Time, and Visionary Buddhism in Renaissance Tibet (Oxford University Press, 2014), and translated in A Mound of Jewels.
Christopher Wilkinson has also translated several of the Seventeen Tantras in the following publications:

Wilkinson, Christopher (2016). The Pearl Necklace Tantra: Upadesha Instructions of the Great PerfectionWilkinson, Christopher (2016). The Lion Stops Hunting: An Upadesha Tantra of the Great PerfectionWilkinson, Christopher (2017). A Mound of Jewels: Three Upadesha Tantras of the Great PerfectionWilkinson, Christopher (2017). The Mirror of the Heart of Vajrasattva: Two Upadesha Tantras of the Great PerfectionWilkinson, Christopher (2017). The Six Spaces of the All Good: An Upadesha Tantra of the Great PerfectionWilkinson, Christopher (2017). The Jewel Maker: The Great Tantra on the Consequence of SoundWilkinson, Christopher (2018). A Subtle Arrangement of Gemstones: Two Upadesha Tantras of the Great PerfectionThe Seventeen Tantras are quoted extensively throughout Longchenpa's (1308 - 1364?) 'The Precious Treasury of the Way of Abiding' translated by Richard Barron and Padma Translation Committee (1998). This work is one of Longchenpa's Seven Treasuries. The Tibetan text is available in unicode at Tsadra’s digital Dharma Text Repository. The Seventeen Tantras are also extensively discussed in Longchenpa's Precious Treasury of Philosophical Systems, also translated by Richard Barron, as well as in Vimalamitra's Great Commentary, translated in Buddhahood in This Life, by Smith.

Additionally, an explanatory tantra (Skt: vyākhyātantra) of the Seventeen Tantras named Total Illumination of the Bindu (Tib: thig le kun gsal) has been published in a translation by Keith Dowman in the book Everything Is Light'' (Dzogchen Now, 2017).

References

Citations

Works cited